Magumeri is a Local Government Area of Borno State, Nigeria. Its headquarters are in the town of Magumeri.

It has an area of 4,856 km and a population of 140,231 at the 2006 census.

The postal code of the area is 602.

It is one of the sixteen LGAs that constitute the Borno Emirate, a traditional state located in Borno State, Nigeria.

References

Local Government Areas in Borno State
Populated places in Borno State